Lebel (also Le Bel or LeBel) is a surname, and may refer to:

 Denis Lebel, Canadian politician
 Dominique Guillaume Lebel, Louis XV's valet-de-chambres and pimp who brought him a selection of young women in the Parc-aux-Cerfs
 Firmin Lebel, French composer
 Ghislain Lebel, militant Canadian politician and former Member of Parliament
 Hardy LeBel, video game designer
 Jean-Baptiste Lebel, French painter, 18th century
 Jean Lebel, Belgian chronicler
 Jean-Jacques Lebel, French painter
 Joseph Le Bel, French chemist
 Louis LeBel, Judge of the Canadian Supreme Court
 Maurice Lebel, Canadian academic
 Nicolas Lebel, French military officer and member of the commission that supervised the development of the Lebel Model 1886 rifle
 Robert Lebel, Canadian ice hockey administrator and former Mayor of Chambly, Quebec

See also 

 Lebel (disambiguation)